Nottingham London Road railway station was opened by the Great Northern Railway on London Road Nottingham in 1857.

History

The station was opened in 1857 by the Great Northern Railway (GNR) at the terminus of its line from Grantham, originally built by the Ambergate, Nottingham, Boston and Eastern Junction Railway. The station was designed by the local architect Thomas Chambers Hine. GNR trains originally used the Midland station in Nottingham, but there were frequent disputes, especially when the GNR began running through trains from London King's Cross via Grantham in a shorter time than the Midland Railway could manage. To solve the problem, the GNR opened its own station served by a new line from near Netherfield, adjacent to the Midland line whose tracks it had previously used.

When Nottingham Victoria railway station was opened in 1900, the Great Northern had to construct a new chord line, carried mainly on brick arches and steel girders, by means of a junction at Trent Lane, east of London Road, to Weekday Cross where it joined the Great Central main line. The new chord line included a station on an island platform, reached by means of a staircase from the booking office on the same approach road to the earlier London Road terminus. To avoid confusion the new station was designated 'High Level' and the old station renamed 'Low Level'. The transfer to Victoria Station gave the Great Northern a prestigious location and avoided their need to reverse trains to and from Grantham, Derbyshire, and north of Nottingham. Passenger services at the low level station were substantially reduced with the opening of the Victoria station and the last passenger service ran on 22 May 1944. The station however remained open as a mail depot for troops during the Second World War before becoming a parcels depot until the 1970s. 

From 7 January 1963 passenger steam trains between Grantham, Bottesford, Elton and Orston, Aslockton, Bingham, Radcliffe-on-Trent, Netherfield and Colwick, Nottingham London-road (High Level) and Nottingham (Victoria) were replaced with diesel-multiple unit trains. 

Passengers services to the High Level station were withdrawn on 3 July 1967 when the service to Grantham was diverted to Nottingham Midland station. This left the only service using Victoria Station as that to Leicester Central and Rugby Central on the former Great Central route.

Present day 
Although severely damaged by fire in 1996, the station building has been restored and was converted to a Holmes Place health and fitness club. It is now used as a Virgin Active Health Club. The High Level station was demolished in 2006.

References 

A Regional History of the Railways of Great Britain. Volume 9 The East Midlands, Robin Leleux.

Buildings and structures in Nottingham
Disused railway stations in Nottinghamshire
Former Great Northern Railway stations
Railway stations in Great Britain opened in 1857
Railway stations in Great Britain opened in 1900
Railway stations in Great Britain closed in 1944
Railway stations in Great Britain closed in 1967
Thomas Chambers Hine railway stations
1857 establishments in England